Asylguzhino (Aśığulja) is a rural locality (a village) in Arslanovsky Selsoviet, Kiginsky District, Bashkortostan, Russia. The population was 223 as of 2010. There are 3 streets.

Geography 
Asylguzhino is located 43 km southeast of Verkhniye Kigi (the district's administrative centre) by road. Postroyki is the nearest rural locality.

References 

Rural localities in Kiginsky District